The Burden of Proof is a 1968 crime novel by the British writer James Barlow.

Synopsis
Vic Dakin a crime lord with a vast empire across London takes place on a raid on a wages van that goes wrong. Needing an alibi he arranges to blackmail a corrupt MP with evidence of his sexual wrongdoing to give perjured testimony in court. However, the police are doggedly on Dakin's trail.

Adaptation
In 1971 it was adapted into the British film Villain directed by Michael Tuchner and starring Richard Burton, Ian McShane and Nigel Davenport. As a tie-in with the film the novel was reissued with the alternative title Villain.

References

Bibliography
 Clinton, Franz Anthony. British Thrillers, 1950-1979: 845 Films of Suspense, Mystery, Murder and Espionage. McFarland, 2020.
 Goble, Alan. The Complete Index to Literary Sources in Film. Walter de Gruyter, 1999.
 Turner, Alwyn W. Crisis? What Crisis?: Britain in the 1970s. Aurum,  2009.

1968 British novels
Novels set in London
British crime novels
Novels by James Barlow
British novels adapted into films
Hamish Hamilton books